The Men's 200m T36 had its Final held on September 15 at 17:42.

Medalists

Results

References
Final

Athletics at the 2008 Summer Paralympics